Vladimir Gennadyevich Malkov (born 15 January 1980) is a former Russian professional footballer.

External links
 
 

1980 births
Living people
People from Yoshkar-Ola
Russian footballers
Association football goalkeepers
Russian expatriate footballers
Expatriate footballers in Armenia
Expatriate footballers in Belarus
Expatriate footballers in Estonia
Armenian Premier League players
FC Neftekhimik Nizhnekamsk players
FC Belshina Bobruisk players
FC Orenburg players
Ulisses FC players
JK Narva Trans players
Sportspeople from Mari El
Belarusian Premier League players
Meistriliiga players
FC Nosta Novotroitsk players
FC Volga Ulyanovsk players
Russian expatriate sportspeople in Armenia
Russian expatriate sportspeople in Belarus
Russian expatriate sportspeople in Estonia